The men's trampoline competition at the 2012 Summer Olympics was held at the North Greenwich Arena on 3 August.

Competition format

In the qualification round, each gymnast performed two routines: compulsory and voluntary. Scores for the two were summed, and the top eight competitors moved on to the final. In the final, each gymnast performed a single routine, with qualification scores not carrying over.

Qualification results

Final results

References

Trampoline, Men's
2012 Men's
Men's events at the 2012 Summer Olympics